Hocuspocus is a 1930 German comedy film parallel version directed by Gustav Ucicky, starring Anglo-German Lilian Harvey, Willy Fritsch, and Oskar Homolka. It was the first adaptation of the 1926 play Hokuspokus by Curt Goetz, but used different role names.

After unsuccessful painter Paul Kellermann has disappeared, interest in his paintings rises, until his soft-spoken widow Kitty Kellermann is accused to have murdered her husband by drowning him in a lake. A mysterious person warns the court president Grandt that somebody wants to kill him, and he sends a telegram to his friend and lawyer to come for support. The night before the court session that likely will sentence her, a surprise visitor shows up at night and seemingly provides ample evidence that his friend and lawyer, knowing about the terms in the testament, has the intention to take advantage of that, having bought a ticket well before he received the telegram. After making his point that things are not always as they may seem, as simple sleight of hand "hocus-pocus" tricks and a forged date on a ticket apparently had convinced the judge within minutes that his long-term friend has evil intentions, the visitor declares that he is Peter Bille, a former circus artist, escape artist, illusionist, speed painter, trick shooter and jurist, and that he will defend poor and innocent Mrs. Kellermann because her lawyer has stepped down.

The film sets were designed by the art directors Robert Herlth and Walter Röhrig. Both versions were shot at the Babelsberg Studios.

The English-language version was made at the same time, The Temporary Widow, the title referring to one of the paintings. Also directed by Ucicky and starring bi-lingual Lilian Harvey, Laurence Olivier acted in his first full movie. Two more German movies were made after the war, this time with the original role names (Agda Kjerulf instead of Kitty Kellermann etc.), with Goetz in 1953, and after Goetz's death in color in 1966.

Cast
Lilian Harvey as Kitty Kellermann
Willy Fritsch as Peter Bille
Oskar Homolka as Grandt
Gustaf Gründgens as Dr. Wilke
Otto Wallburg as Dr. Schüler
Fritz Schmuck as Hartmann
Ferdinand von Alten as Lindborg
Harry Halm as Kolbe
Rudolf Biebrach as Morchen
René Hubert as Loiret
Kurt Lilien as Kulicke
Ruth Albu as Anny Sedal
Max Ehrlich as Kuhnen

References

External links

Films of the Weimar Republic
1930 comedy films
German multilingual films
Films directed by Gustav Ucicky
German films based on plays
Films based on works by Curt Goetz
German courtroom films
Films about fictional painters
UFA GmbH films
Films shot at Babelsberg Studios
German black-and-white films
German comedy films
1930 multilingual films
Films scored by Robert Stolz
1930s German films